Dark resurrection may refer to:

 Tekken 5: Dark Resurrection, a 2005 Tekken video game
 Dark Resurrection, a 2007 Star Wars fanfilm